Saint Sava III ( / Sveti Sava III; died July 16, 1316) was the Archbishop of Serbs from 1309 to 1316. Upon completing his studies, he began as a hegumen in  Hilandar, then became the Bishop of Prizren. During his office as bishop, he worked on the Bogorodica Ljeviška church in Prizren. In 1309 he became the Archbishop. Sava III was an important figure of the development of architecture in Medieval Serbia. Prior to the founding of the Banjska monastery, which Sava III did not survive, King Stefan Milutin consulted with him. In his charters confirming the endowments of King Milutin, he is styled "Archbishop of All Serbian and Maritime Lands". He rebuilt the Church of Saint George in Staro Nagoričane. According to the testimonies of his successor Archbishop Nikodim I, he regularly donated to Hilandar. The Serbian Orthodox Church venerate him as Saint Sava III on July 26 (August 8, Gregorian calendar).

References

Sources
Pakitibija.com, Житије срба светитеља: Сава Трећи, светитељ - архиепископ

14th-century Serbian people
14th-century Christian saints
14th-century Eastern Orthodox bishops
Archbishops of Serbs
Serbian saints of the Eastern Orthodox Church
People of the Kingdom of Serbia (medieval)
Year of birth missing
1316 deaths
Medieval Serbian Orthodox bishops